Wautubbee is an unincorporated community in Clarke County, Mississippi, United States.

History
Wautubbee was founded in 1882. Wautubbee is a name derived from the Choctaw language purported to mean "the one who hunts and kills". A variant name was "Hells Valley". Wautubbee is located on the former New Orleans and Northeastern Railroad.

A post office operated under the name Wautubbee from 1893 to 1906.

The Ruby Lumber Company and Pine Hill Lumber Company were based in Wautubbee and both operated sawmills there.

The Wautubbee Formation is named for Wautubbee.

References

Unincorporated communities in Mississippi
Unincorporated communities in Clarke County, Mississippi
Mississippi placenames of Native American origin